Civic Center is a district in Downtown Bakersfield, California. It is the center of government for the City of Bakersfield and the County of Kern, containing a collection of buildings used by the city, county, state, and federal governments. The district also contains all of downtown's sporting complexes. It also has the Rabobank Theater and Convention Center, which is the largest theater and convention facilities in the city.

Government buildings
Bakersfield Police Department
Centennial Center (federal)
City Hall North (Bakersfield)
City Hall South (Bakersfield)
County of Kern Administrative Center
Development Services Building (Bakersfield)
Hall of Records (Kern County)
Kern County Child Protective Services/Forensic Science
Kern County Superintendent of Schools
Municipal Courthouse (Kern County)
Superior Courthouse (Kern County)

Note: Some government agencies use rented space within the district, instead of owning their own building.

Sports complexes
Bakersfield Ice Sports Center
McMurtrey Aquatic Center
Rabobank Arena

Theaters
Rabobank Theater and Convention Center

Neighborhoods in Bakersfield, California